The 2014 KHL Junior Draft was the sixth entry draft held by the Kontinental Hockey League (KHL). It took place on May 8, 2014. Ice hockey players from around the world aged between 17 and 21 years of age were selected. Players eligible to take part in the draft were required to not have an active contract with a KHL, MHL or VHL team.

See also
2014–15 KHL season
2014 NHL Entry Draft
KHL territorial pick

References

External links
 KHL Draft - EliteProspects

Kontinental Hockey League Junior Draft
Junior Draft